Commodore Uriah P. Levy Center and Jewish Chapel is the Jewish chapel at the United States Naval Academy, in Annapolis, Maryland. 

The center is named in honor of Commodore Uriah P. Levy (1792–-1862), the first Jewish commodore in the United States Navy, who is famous for refusing to flog his sailors. The Levy Center is adjacent to Mitscher Hall and contains a 410-seat synagogue, a fellowship hall, a Character Learning Center, classrooms, and offices for the Brigade’s social director, the academic board, and the Academy’s Honor Board.

Before the chapel was completed in 2005, Jewish midshipmen attended Congregation Knesset Israel in downtown Annapolis, or held services in the interfaith chapel at Mitscher Hall.

History
The groundbreaking ceremony was held on November 2, 2003. The builder was the Whiting-Turner Contracting Company.  The building was dedicated in September 2005.

The Levy Center cost $8 million to design, build and furnish. Approximately $1.8 million was paid for with military construction funds. The remaining amount was paid for by private donations raised by the Friend of the Jewish Chapel, a campaign headed by Jewish alumni of the academy and others. It was given to the Academy upon completion.

Architecture
The  building was designed by Maryland architect Joseph Boggs. The entrance pavilion has elements related to the center bay of Thomas Jefferson's Monticello.  Levy purchased Monticello in 1834 and restored it because of his admiration for Jefferson, who died in 1826. The chapel includes a nearly 45-foot-high wall that is a replica of the Western Wall in Jerusalem. The wall is made of Jerusalem stone. The roof of the building is constructed of copper. The architecture of the exterior is consistent with nearby Bancroft Hall.

The chapel was awarded the Maryland AIA Honor Awards 2006, Public Building of the Year; Institutional.

See also
Aloha Jewish Chapel
West Point Jewish Chapel
Jewish American military history
National Museum of American Jewish Military History
Jewish War Veterans
Naval Academy Chapel
United States Navy Chaplain Corps
United States Air Force Academy Cadet Chapel (including Jewish chapel)
United States Military Academy Chapel

Footnotes

References
Honor: Uriah P. Levy Center and Jewish Chapel, by Pamela Lerner Jaccarino, Sandow Media (June 1, 2008)
 Saving Monticello: The Levy Family's Epic Quest to Rescue the House that Jefferson Built (Free Press, 2001, hardcover; University of Virginia Press, 2003, paper) by Marc Leepson

External links
Naval Academy Jewish Chapel

Synagogues in Maryland
United States Naval Academy buildings and structures
University and college chapels in the United States
Military chapels of the United States
Unaffiliated synagogues in the United States
Synagogues completed in 2005
Jewish-American military history
Religious buildings and structures in Annapolis, Maryland
2005 establishments in Maryland